Henry-Clément Sanson (27 May 1799 – 25 January 1889) was a French executioner. He held the position of Royal Executioner of the City of Paris, serving King Louis-Philippe I from 1840 to 1847.

Sanson was born into a long line of executioners. His father was Henri Sanson, the city's chief executioner for 47 years, and his grandfather was Charles-Henri Sanson, the storied executioner of royals and revolutionaries.

Personal history
Early in his career as executioner, Henry-Clément was described contemporaneously as being "in person a fine figure, with an elegant and noble countenance, and a very sweet and agreeable expression". His pleasant demeanor belied a deep inner anguish: he simply could not reconcile himself to his family profession. His profound unhappiness led him to seek anaesthetic refuge in alcohol and other vices. Most unlike his rectitudinous forebears, Henry-Clément immersed himself in a dissolute and profligate lifestyle, and his extravagance left him desperately in need of income. Among other unconventional methods of moneymaking, he established a musée des horreurs in his home, where for five francs the curious public could watch the famous Sanson family guillotine be used to decapitate a sheep.

Career as executioner
Henry-Clement served less than eight years as the Monsieur de Paris, the shortest duration of any of the Sanson dynasty. The end of his career came in 1847, after he was compelled by debt to pawn his ancestral guillotine for 3,000 francs. He attempted to commence his next execution armed only with one of his ancestor's axes. The French government bought the guillotine back, summoned Sanson back for the execution, and dismissed him immediately when it was complete.

Henry-Clément was the last executioner of the Sanson family line. He was replaced by Charles-André Férey.

Memoirs
After his dismissal, Henry-Clement dictated his memoirs to a journalist, the six-volume Seven Generations of Executioners, 1688 - 1847. Though often dismissed as fiction - like the spurious "memoirs" ascribed to his grandfather - Henri-Clement's recollections are considered by some scholars to have at least a basis in fact. Admittedly ghostwritten (and probably embellished), Seven Generations is considered reasonably reliable and may even draw upon an actual diary written by his grandfather.

References

External links
Sanson family article in French Wikipedia

1799 births
1889 deaths
French executioners